The 2022 Men's Hockey Africa Cup of Nations was the 11th edition of the Men's Hockey Africa Cup of Nations, the quadrennial international men's field hockey championship of Africa organised by the African Hockey Federation. In February 2021 it was announced that the tournament would be held alongside the women's tournament at the Theodosia Okoh Hockey Stadium in Accra, Ghana from 17 to 23 January 2022.

South Africa were the defending champions, winning the 2017 edition. They successfully defended their title after being Egypt in the final. The winner qualified for the 2023 Men's FIH Hockey World Cup.

Qualification
The top two highest-ranked teams in the FIH World Rankings qualified directly for the tournament while the other teams played in the regional qualifiers. The top two teams from each of the regional qualifiers qualified for the tournament. The three regions were North-East Africa, North-West Africa, and Central-South Africa.

Preliminary round
The schedule was published on 14 December 2021.

All times are local (UTC±0).

Pool A

Pool B

Fifth to seventh place classification

Bracket

Sixth place game

Fifth place game

First to fourth place classification

Bracket

Semi-finals

Third place game

Final

Final ranking

Goalscorers

See also
2022 Women's Hockey Africa Cup of Nations

References

Africa Cup of Nations
Men's Hockey Africa Cup of Nations
Hockey Africa Cup of Nations
Hockey Africa Cup of Nations
Sport in Accra
International field hockey competitions hosted by Ghana
21st century in Accra
Africa Cup of Nations